Katherine Schwarzenegger Pratt (born December 13, 1989) is an American author. She has written three self-help books, on subjects like self-image, forgiveness and finding direction after college; she has also written a children’s book about adopting her dog. Schwarzenegger is the eldest child of Arnold Schwarzenegger and Maria Shriver. She is married to actor Chris Pratt, with whom she has two daughters.

Early life and family
Schwarzenegger is the eldest child of Austrian-born actor and politician Arnold Schwarzenegger and journalist and author Maria Shriver. She is of Irish and German descent through her maternal grandparents Eunice and Sargent Shriver. Her grandmother was a younger sister to President John F. Kennedy while her grandfather was a U.S. Ambassador to France and the Democratic nominee for Vice President of the United States in the 1972 election.

She has a younger sister and two younger brothers, including Patrick. She also has a half-brother through her father.

Career and advocacy

In 2010, Schwarzenegger wrote a book entitled Rock What You've Got: Secrets to Loving Your Inner and Outer Beauty from Someone Who's Been There and Back. In it, Schwarzenegger describes her personal journey and encourages other young women to achieve confidence and a positive self-image. She had body image issues between fourth and seventh grade, but now controls her physical and mental health with walking exercises and yoga.

After graduating from the University of Southern California in 2012 she was unsure of her next steps. Schwarzenegger sought career advice from a variety of people, including athletes, singers, entrepreneurs and actors.  She compiled their wisdom into her second book— I Just Graduated . . . Now What?—which was released in 2014 as a "survival guide" for recent college grads.

In 2017, Schwarzenegger authored a children's book, Maverick and Me.  The book tells the story of her rescue and subsequent adoption of her dog, Maverick.  Using her own experience as a "foster fail" (when a foster home turns into a "furever" home), the book touts the benefits of pet adoption and rescue. In 2019, she partnered up with Pedigree to host a limited-series podcast discussing the importance of adopting dogs.

The Gift of Forgiveness: Inspiring Stories from Those Who Have Overcome the Unforgivable is Schwarzenegger's latest book, which is a compilation of stories of forgiveness. The book features the stories of 22 people including Elizabeth Smart and Tanya Brown (sister of Nicole Brown-Simpson).

Schwarzenegger is an American Society for the Prevention of Cruelty to Animals Ambassador and supports the Best Friends Animal Society.

Personal life
Schwarzenegger started dating actor Chris Pratt in 2018. They announced their engagement in January and married in June 2019. They have two daughters, one born in August 2020 and the other in May 2022.

Bibliography

References

External links

21st-century American non-fiction writers
21st-century American women writers
American motivational writers
American people of Austrian descent
American people of Czech descent
American people of German descent
American people of Irish descent
American women non-fiction writers
Kennedy family
Living people
Schwarzenegger family
Shriver family
USC Annenberg School for Communication and Journalism alumni
Women motivational writers
1989 births